Neotelphusa sequax (crepuscular rock-rose moth) is a moth of the family Gelechiidae. It is found in most of Europe and has also been recorded from North America.

The wingspan is 11–14 mm. Adults are on wing in July.

The larvae feed on Helianthemum nummularium and Helianthemum oelandicum. They feed from a spun terminal shoot of their host plant. The spinning often has the form of a tight ball. Larvae can be found from May to early June. They are dull grey-green with a brown ochre head. The color changes to yellowish olive with a burnt ochre head and finally to yellow with a gold ochre head. Pupation takes place among detritus on the ground.

References

Moths described in 1828
Neotelphusa
Moths of Europe